VA-65 may refer to:
Attack Squadron 65 (U.S. Navy)
State Route 65 (Virginia)